Protein fosB, also known as FosB and G0/G1 switch regulatory protein 3 (G0S3), is a protein that in humans is encoded by the FBJ murine osteosarcoma viral oncogene homolog B (FOSB) gene.

The FOS gene family consists of four members: FOS, FOSB, FOSL1, and FOSL2. These genes encode leucine zipper proteins that can dimerize with proteins of the JUN family (e.g., c-Jun, JunD), thereby forming the transcription factor complex AP-1. As such, the FOS proteins have been implicated as regulators of cell proliferation, differentiation, and transformation. FosB and its truncated splice variants, ΔFosB and further truncated Δ2ΔFosB, are all involved in osteosclerosis, although Δ2ΔFosB lacks a known transactivation domain, in turn preventing it from affecting transcription through the AP-1 complex.

The ΔFosB splice variant has been identified as playing a central, crucial (necessary and sufficient) role in the development and maintenance of addiction. ΔFosB overexpression (i.e., an abnormally and excessively high level of ΔFosB expression which produces a pronounced gene-related phenotype) triggers the development of addiction-related neuroplasticity throughout the reward system and produces a behavioral phenotype that is characteristic of an addiction. ΔFosB differs from the full length FosB and further truncated Δ2ΔFosB in its capacity to produce these effects, as only accumbal ΔFosB overexpression is associated with pathological responses to drugs.

DeltaFosB
DeltaFosB – more commonly written as ΔFosB – is a truncated splice variant of the FOSB gene. ΔFosB has been implicated as a critical factor in the development of virtually all forms of behavioral and drug addictions. In the brain's reward system, it is linked to changes in a number of other gene products, such as CREB and sirtuins. In the body, ΔFosB regulates the commitment of mesenchymal precursor cells to the adipocyte or osteoblast lineage.

In the nucleus accumbens, ΔFosB functions as a "sustained molecular switch" and "master control protein" in the development of an addiction. In other words, once "turned on" (sufficiently overexpressed) ΔFosB triggers a series of transcription events that ultimately produce an addictive state (i.e., compulsive reward-seeking involving a particular stimulus); this state is sustained for months after cessation of drug use due to the abnormal and exceptionally long half-life of ΔFosB isoforms. ΔFosB expression in D1-type nucleus accumbens medium spiny neurons directly and positively regulates drug self-administration and reward sensitization through positive reinforcement while decreasing sensitivity to aversion. Based upon the accumulated evidence, a medical review from late 2014 argued that accumbal ΔFosB expression can be used as an addiction biomarker and that the degree of accumbal ΔFosB induction by a drug is a metric for how addictive it is relative to others.

Chronic administration of Anandamide, or N-arachidonylethanolamide (AEA), an endogenous cannabinoid, and additives such as sucrose, a noncaloric sweetener used in many food products of daily intake, are found to induce an overexpression of ΔFosB in the infralimbic cortex (Cx), nucleus accumbens (NAc) core, shell, and central nucleus of amygdala (Amy), that induce long-term changes in the reward system.

Role in addiction

Chronic addictive drug use causes alterations in gene expression in the mesocorticolimbic projection, which arise through transcriptional and epigenetic mechanisms. The most important transcription factors that produce these alterations are ΔFosB, cyclic adenosine monophosphate (cAMP) response element binding protein (CREB), and nuclear factor kappa B (NF-κB). ΔFosB is the most significant biomolecular mechanism in addiction because the overexpression of ΔFosB in the D1-type medium spiny neurons in the nucleus accumbens is necessary and sufficient for many of the neural adaptations and behavioral effects (e.g., expression-dependent increases in drug self-administration and reward sensitization) seen in drug addiction. ΔFosB overexpression has been implicated in addictions to alcohol (ethanol), cannabinoids, cocaine, methylphenidate, nicotine, opioids, phencyclidine, propofol, and substituted amphetamines, among others. ΔJunD, a transcription factor, and G9a, a histone methyltransferase, both oppose the function of ΔFosB and inhibit increases in its expression. Increases in nucleus accumbens ΔJunD expression (via viral vector-mediated gene transfer) or G9a expression (via pharmacological means) reduces, or with a large increase can even block, many of the neural and behavioral alterations seen in chronic drug abuse (i.e., the alterations mediated by ΔFosB). Repression of c-Fos by ΔFosB, which consequently further induces expression of ΔFosB, forms a positive feedback loop that serves to indefinitely perpetuate the addictive state.

ΔFosB also plays an important role in regulating behavioral responses to natural rewards, such as palatable food, sex, and exercise. Natural rewards, similar to drugs of abuse, induce gene expression of ΔFosB in the nucleus accumbens, and chronic acquisition of these rewards can result in a similar pathological addictive state through ΔFosB overexpression. Consequently, ΔFosB is the key mechanism involved in addictions to natural rewards (i.e., behavioral addictions) as well; in particular, ΔFosB in the nucleus accumbens is critical for the reinforcing effects of sexual reward. Research on the interaction between natural and drug rewards suggests that dopaminergic psychostimulants (e.g., amphetamine) and sexual behavior act on similar biomolecular mechanisms to induce ΔFosB in the nucleus accumbens and possess bidirectional reward cross-sensitization effects that are mediated through ΔFosB. This phenomenon is notable since, in humans, a dopamine dysregulation syndrome, characterized by drug-induced compulsive engagement in natural rewards (specifically, sexual activity, shopping, and gambling), has also been observed in some individuals taking dopaminergic medications.

ΔFosB inhibitors (drugs or treatments that oppose its action or reduce its expression) may be an effective treatment for addiction and addictive disorders. Current medical reviews of research involving lab animals have identified a drug class – class I histone deacetylase inhibitors – that indirectly inhibits the function and further increases in the expression of accumbal ΔFosB by inducing G9a expression in the nucleus accumbens after prolonged use. These reviews and subsequent preliminary evidence which used oral administration or intraperitoneal administration of the sodium salt of butyric acid or other class I HDAC inhibitors for an extended period indicate that these drugs have efficacy in reducing addictive behavior in lab animals that have developed addictions to ethanol, psychostimulants (i.e., amphetamine and cocaine), nicotine, and opiates; however, few clinical trials involving humans with addiction and any HDAC class I inhibitors have been conducted to test for treatment efficacy in humans or identify an optimal dosing regimen.

Plasticity in cocaine addiction

ΔFosB levels have been found to increase upon the use of cocaine. Each subsequent dose of cocaine continues to increase ΔFosB levels with no apparent ceiling of tolerance. Elevated levels of ΔFosB leads to increases in brain-derived neurotrophic factor (BDNF) levels, which in turn increases the number of dendritic branches and spines present on neurons involved with the nucleus accumbens and prefrontal cortex areas of the brain. This change can be identified rather quickly, and may be sustained weeks after the last dose of the drug.

Transgenic mice exhibiting inducible expression of ΔFosB primarily in the nucleus accumbens and dorsal striatum exhibit sensitized behavioural responses to cocaine. They self-administer cocaine at lower doses than control, but have a greater likelihood of relapse when the drug is withheld. ΔFosB increases the expression of AMPA receptor subunit GluR2 and also decreases expression of dynorphin, thereby enhancing sensitivity to reward.

Summary of addiction-related plasticity

Other functions in the brain

Viral overexpression of ΔFosB in the output neurons of the nigrostriatal dopamine pathway (i.e., the medium spiny neurons in the dorsal striatum) induces levodopa-induced dyskinesias in animal models of Parkinson's disease. Dorsal striatal ΔFosB is overexpressed in rodents and primates with dyskinesias; postmortem studies of individuals with Parkinson's disease that were treated with levodopa have also observed similar dorsal striatal ΔFosB overexpression. Levetiracetam, an antiepileptic drug, has been shown to dose-dependently decrease the induction of dorsal striatal ΔFosB expression in rats when co-administered with levodopa; the signal transduction involved in this effect is unknown.

ΔFosB expression in the nucleus accumbens shell increases resilience to stress and is induced in this region by acute exposure to social defeat stress.

Antipsychotic drugs have been shown to increase ΔFosB as well, more specifically in the prefrontal cortex. This increase has been found to be part of pathways for the negative side effects that such drugs produce.

See also 
 AP-1 (transcription factor)

Notes

Image legend

References

Further reading

External links 
 ROLE OF ΔFOSB IN THE NUCLEUS ACCUMBENS
 KEGG Pathway – human alcohol addiction
 KEGG Pathway – human amphetamine addiction
 KEGG Pathway – human cocaine addiction
 

Δ0
Oncogenes
Transcription factors